The Loveliest Thing on Earth (Swedish: Det vackraste på jorden) is a 1947 Swedish drama film directed by and starring Anders Henrikson and also featuring Marianne Löfgren, Per Oscarsson and Inger Juel. It was shot at the Sundbyberg Studios of Europa Film in Stockholm and on location in the city. The film's sets were designed by the art director Max Linder.

Cast
 Anders Henrikson as 	Georg Isakson
 Marianne Löfgren as 	Greta Isakson
 Per Oscarsson as 	Tomas Isakson
 Erik Hell as Bengt Kahlman
 Inger Juel as 	Karin Kahlman
 Stig Järrel as 	Tobacconist Frithiof
 Irma Christenson as 	Tilda
 Ann Westerlund as 	Elsa
 Kenne Fant as 	Göran Thome

References

Bibliography 
 Qvist, Per Olov & von Bagh, Peter. Guide to the Cinema of Sweden and Finland. Greenwood Publishing Group, 2000.

External links 
 

1947 films
Swedish drama films
1947 drama films
1940s Swedish-language films
Films directed by Anders Henrikson
Swedish black-and-white films
Films shot in Stockholm
1940s Swedish films